Calendar Girl is the debut solo studio album by Australian recording artist Sophie Monk, released on 5 May 2003 by Warner Music. It debuted at No. 35 on the ARIA Albums Chart top 50. The album was mixed with contemporary pop as well as the religious classics tracks "Pie Jesu", "Ave Maria" (Interlude) and "Ave Maria".

The song "Come My Way" was also recorded by Japanese pop star Namie Amuro (her version was titled "Come") in Japanese and was featured in the anime InuYasha. It was released first as a single on 14 October 2003 and on the album Style on 10 December of the same year.

Track listing

Charts

Release history

References

2003 debut albums
Sophie Monk albums
Warner Music Group albums